The Independent National Electoral Commission (INEC) is the electoral body which oversees elections in Nigeria. It was established in 1998 shortly before Nigeria's transition from military to civilian rule.

History

Regulation and administration of elections 
The administration of democratic elections in Nigeria dates back to the period before Independence when the Electoral Commission of Nigeria (ECN) was inaugurated in 1958 to conduct the 1959  federal elections. Prior to 1958, regional laws and government regulated and conducted elections. ECN was headed by an expatriate, Ronald Edward Wraith and four Nigerian members representing each region and the Federal Capital Territory of Lagos. The Federal Electoral Commission (FEC), established in 1960 conducted the immediate post-independence federal and regional elections of 1964 and 1965. Prior to the conduct of the 1964 election, the Chief Electoral Officer, Kofo Abayomi resigned and some party officials from the NCNC and Action Group doubted the credibility of a free and fair election. The electoral body was dissolved after the military coup of 1966 in Nigeria. In 1978, the Federal Electoral Commission(FEDECO) was constituted by the regime of General Olusegun Obasanjo, organizing the elections of 1979 which ushered in the Nigerian Second Republic under the leadership of Alhaji Shehu Shagari.  It also conducted the general elections of 1983.

In December 1995, the military government under the leadership of general Sani Abacha established the National Electoral Commission of Nigeria which conducted another set of elections. These elected institutions were not inaugurated before the sudden death of General Abacha in June 1998 aborted the process. In 1998, General Abdulsalam Abubakar's Administration dissolved National Electoral Commission of Nigeria (NECON) and established the Independent National Electoral Commission (INEC). INEC organized the transitional elections that ushered in the Nigerian Fourth Republic on May 29, 1999.

In January 2015, the "#BringBackOurGirls group raised the alarm over plans by the Independent National Electoral Commission (INEC) to exclude Chibok and some communities currently under the control of the Boko Haram from getting the permanent voter cards (PVCs) for the February elections."

Leadership 
The Chairman of the first Nigerian Federal Electoral Commission (FEC) was Chief Eyo Esua (1964–1966) in the First Republic. When General Olusegun Obasanjo prepared for a return to civilian power in the Second Republic, he established a new Federal Electoral Commission headed by Chief Michael Ani to supervise the 1979 elections. Ani was succeeded by Justice Victor Ovie Whisky.
During the Ibrahim Babangida and Sani Abacha regimes, which attempted returns to democracy, the National Electoral Commission of Nigeria was headed by Professor Eme Awa (1987–1989), Professor Humphrey Nwosu (1989–1993), Professor Okon Uya and Chief Sumner Dagogo-Jack (1994–1998).

INEC 
General Abdulsalami Abubakar established the current INEC, with Justice Ephraim Akpata as chairman.
Akpata had to deal with 26 political associations, giving only nine provisional registration as political parties for the 1998–1999 elections, eventually whittled down to three parties.
Despite efforts to ensure free and fair elections, the process drew serious criticism from international observers.
After Akpata died in January 2000, the government of President Olusegun Obasanjo appointed Abel Guobadia Nigeria's Chief Electoral Officer, a position that was confirmed by the Nigerian Senate in May 2000.
Guobadia was responsible for the 2003 elections, which were marred by widespread violence and other irregularities.

In June 2005, Guobadia retired and was succeeded by Professor Maurice Iwu. Soon after being appointed, Iwu announced that foreign monitors would not be allowed during elections, but only foreign election observers. This decision was condemned by politicians and civil society groups who called for his immediate removal from office.
The conduct of the 2007 elections was again criticized as falling below acceptable democratic standards.

On 8 June 2010, Professor Attahiru Muhammadu Jega was nominated by President Goodluck Jonathan as the new INEC Chairman, subject to Senate confirmation, as a replacement for Iwu, who had vacated the post on 28 April 2010. Jega's nomination as INEC chairman followed approval by a meeting of the National Council of State called by President Jonathan and attended by former heads of state Yakubu Gowon, Muhammadu Buhari, Ibrahim Babangida, Abdulsalami Abubakar, Ernest Shonekan, Olusegun Obasanjo and Shehu Shagari.
The Senate President David Mark, Speaker of the House of Representatives Oladimeji Bankole, and most of the state Governors also attended the meeting.
Unanimous approval by the council of the nominee for this critical appointment avoided controversy about whether or not the President should appoint the chairman of the INEC.
Reactions to the announcement from a broad spectrum of political leaders and organisations were positive, although some voiced concern that it could be too late to implement real reforms before the 2011 elections.

During the campaign for the 2015 Nigerian general elections, Attahiru Jega "faced fierce criticism from both the opposition and the ruling party."
Attahiru Jega's five-year term came to an end on June 30, 2015, and though he was qualified for re-appointment, the chances of such became remote given the allegations of bias against him by campaign officials of President Goodluck. President Mohammadu Buhari appointed Professor Mahmood Yakubu as INEC Chairman, Professor Yakubu took over from Amina Bala-Zakari, who was the acting chairman after Jega left.

Controversies
The INEC has encountered several controversies in the run-up to elections in the country, most notably the April 2007 general elections, including criticism about its preparedness from Sa'ad Abubakar, Sultan of Sokoto
and a dispute over its "disqualification" of Vice president Atiku Abubakar's candidacy. The Supreme Court ruled that the INEC can not disqualify candidates, so Abubakar's name was added to ballots at the last minute.

On the subject of election irregularities, INEC spokesman Philip Umeadi said on April 19, 2007 that "We are not sitting on any crisis in Nigeria.".
The mission of INEC is to serve as an independent and effective Election Management Bodies (EMB) committed to the conduct of free, fair and credible elections for sustainable democracy in Nigeria. The vision of INEC is to be one of the best Election Management Bodies (EMB) in the world that meets the aspirations of the Nigerian people.

In the buildup to 2015 general elections, the INEC under Jega introduced smart card reader for the verification of voters and their voting cards to minimize incidence of fraud and rigging. The introduction of card readers was hailed by many Nigerians but a group of four minor political parties who claimed to be acting on behalf of 15 political parties kicked against it and urged the INEC to suspend the use of card readers in the 2015 elections. The 2015 general elections were adjudged the most credible, free and fair elections since the return of democracy in 1999.

The INEC was accused of widespread electoral irregularities in the 2019 presidential elections including cases of ballot paper unavailability, smart card readers malfunctioning, and large cancellation of valid votes. The main opposition People's Democratic Party and its presidential candidate challenged the results of the election in court.

See also
List of villages in Nigeria

References

External links
INEC website
INEC Recruitment Page

Election commissions in Nigeria
Organizations established in 1998
1998 establishments in Nigeria